In quantum computing, the Brassard-Høyer-Tapp algorithm or BHT algorithm is a quantum algorithm that solves the collision problem. In this problem, one is given n and an r-to-1 function  and needs to find two inputs that f maps to the same output.

The algorithm was discovered by Gilles Brassard, Peter Høyer, and Alain Tapp in 1997.  It uses Grover's algorithm, which was discovered the year before.

Algorithm
Intuitively, the algorithm combines the square root speedup from the birthday paradox using (classical) randomness with the square root speedup from Grover's (quantum) algorithm.

First, n1/3 inputs to f are selected at random and f is queried at all of them.  If there is a collision among these inputs, then we return the colliding pair of inputs.  Otherwise, all these inputs map to distinct values by f.  Then Grover's algorithm is used to find a new input to f that collides.  Since there are n inputs to f and n1/3 of these could form a collision with the already queried values, Grover's algorithm can find a collision with  extra queries to f.

See also
Element distinctness problem

References

Quantum algorithms